Flip the Switch may refer to:

EPs
 "Flip the Switch", 2013 EP by L.E.D?

Songs
 "Flip the Switch", 1997 song by The Rolling Stones from their 1997 album Bridges to Babylon
 "Flip the Switch", 2018 song by Quavo from his 2018 album Quavo Huncho

See also
 Switch